The Men's scratch competition at the 2022 UCI Track Cycling World Championships was held on 13 October 2022.

Results
The race was started at 20:49. First rider across the line without a net lap loss wins.

References

Men's scratch